Mueang Nong Khai is the capital district (amphoe mueang) of Nong Khai province, northeastern Thailand.

Geography
Neighboring districts are (from the east clockwise): Phon Phisai of Nong Khai Province, Phen of Udon Thani province, Sakhrai and Tha Bo of Nong Khai Province. To the north across the Mekong River is the Lao province Vientiane Prefecture.

The district is served by the Nong Khai railway station.

Administration
The district is divided into 16 sub-districts (tambons), which are further subdivided into 181 villages (mubans). The town (thesaban mueang) Nong Khai covers the tambons Nai Mueang, Michais, and parts of the tambons Pho Chai, Khun Wan, Hat Kham, Nong Kom Ko, and Mueang Mi. There are two sub-district municipalities (thesaban tambons): Nong Song Hong covers parts of tambon Khai Bok Wan, and  Wiang Khuk covers parts of the same-named tambon. There are a further 14 tambon administrative organizations (TAO).

Missing numbers are tambons which now form Sakhrai District.

References

External links
amphoe.com (Thai)

Mueang Nong Khai